Genia Nikolajewa (1904–2001) was a Russian-born German actress who made films in several countries, notably in Germany where she appeared in films such as Robert Siodmak's 1932 comedy Quick in a succession of supporting or minor roles. She later moved to Hollywood. She was sometimes credited as Genia Nikolaieva or Eugenia Nikolajewa.

Life 
Nikolaieva was born in St Petersburg to German-Russian parents, but moved to Germany at an early age. She starred in a series of stage revues which led to her being employed by the film industry. Because she was considered "Half-Jewish" (cf. Mischling) by the Nazis, she found it increasingly difficult to gain roles following the Nazi takeover of Germany and in 1938 she went into exile in Hollywood. As well as making occasionally films, she also worked for Warner Brothers in an administrative role. In 1937, she married the film editor Carl Forcht.

Selected filmography
 Shooting Festival in Schilda (1931)
 Quick (1932)
 A Shot at Dawn (1932)
 Scandal on Park Street (1932)
 A Mad Idea (1932)
 The First Right of the Child (1932)
 The Ugly Girl (1933)
 The Grand Duke's Finances (1934)
 Love and the First Railway (1934)
 The Brenken Case (1934)
 Artist Love (1935)
 Fresh Wind from Canada (1935)
 The Bird Seller (1935)
 Ninety Minute Stopover (1936)
 A Woman of No Importance (1936)
 The Unexcused Hour (1937)
 Escape from Yesterday (1938)
 Adventure in Diamonds (1940)
 The Lady Has Plans (1942)

References

Bibliography
 Alpi, Deborah Lazaroff. Robert Siodmak: A Biography. McFarland, 1998.

External links

1904 births
2001 deaths
German film actresses
Russian film actresses
Emigrants from the Russian Empire to Germany
Emigrants from the Russian Empire to the United States
Actresses from Saint Petersburg
Jewish emigrants from Nazi Germany to the United States
Jewish Russian actors
20th-century German women